Auntie Christ is a late-1990s punk rock band, containing Exene Cervenka and D.J. Bonebrake of the band X and Matt Freeman of the band Rancid.

Discography
 Life Could Be A Dream
Track List:
 "Bad Trip"
 "I Don't"
 "Not You"
 "Tell Me"
 "A Rat in the Tunnel of Love"
 "Look out Below"
 "The Virus"
 "The Nothing Generation"
 "The Future is a War"
 "With a Bullet"

American punk rock groups